Akita (written:  lit. "autumn ricefield") is a Japanese surname. Notable people with the surname include:

, Japanese footballer
, Japanese musician, also known as Merzbow
, Japanese footballer
, Japanese daimyō
, son of Sanesue
, Japanese footballer
Kiyoshi Akita (1881–1944)

Japanese-language surnames